Vera Mackie (born 1955)  is an Australian academic who has specialised in Japanese feminism and gender history. As of 2021 she is Emeritus Senior Professor of Asian and International Studies at the University of Wollongong.

Early life and education 
Mackie was born in Glasgow, Scotland in 1955. In 1964 she moved to Victoria, Australia with her family, where she completed her secondary education at Mentone Girls' Grammar School. She completed a BA (Hons) and MA (1985) at Monash University, before receiving a PhD (1994) from the University of Adelaide.

Career 
From 1998 to 2004 Mackie was Foundation Professor of Japanese Studies at Curtin University. She then was appointed Australian Research Council (ARC) Australian Professorial Fellow at the University of Melbourne from 2004 to 2010. She moved to the University of Wollongong, initially as ARC Future Fellow (2010–2014), then moved into the position of Senior Professor of Asian and International Studies in 2014. She is now Emeritus Professor

Mackie served on the board of the International Federation for Research in Women's History from 2015 to 2020. She was co-convener of the Australian Women's History Network from 2013 to 2016. She is a member of the editorial board of Lilith: A Feminist History Journal, published by the Australian Women's History Network. Commissioning Editor, Japan Focus: The Asia-Pacific Journal, Commissioning Editor, VIDA: Blog of the Australian Women's History Network.

She delivered the 2021 A.R. Davis Memorial Lecture on "Asia in Australia: History on the Streets".

Awards and recognition 
Mackie was elected Fellow of the Academy of the Social Sciences in Australia in 2004 and Fellow of the Royal Society of New South Wales in 2018. She won the 2011 Inoue Yasushi Award for Outstanding Research in Japanese Literature.
She was awarded the University of Wollongong Vice Chancellor's Award for Excellence in Research Supervision in 2018.

Works

References 

1955 births
Living people
Australian women historians
Scottish emigrants to Australia
Monash University alumni
University of Adelaide alumni
Academic staff of Curtin University
Academic staff of the University of Melbourne
Academic staff of the University of Wollongong
People from Glasgow
People educated at Mentone Girls' Grammar School
Australian feminists